As of 2023, this is the list of current, former series broadcast by the Hindi entertainment channel Big Magic.

Current programming

Animated 
 Bandbudh Aur Budbak
 Chimpoo Simpoo
 Pyaar Mohabbat Happy Lucky
  Magic Bhootu
Kailash Ke Rakshak

Live Action 
 Kanha Ki Radhika
 Afsar Bitiya
 Kripa Maa Lakshami Maa Ki
 Aapki Antara
 Yahan Main Ghar Ghar Kheli
Santoshi Maa
Badho Bahu
Mahabharat

Former programming

Animated 
 Chunki Bunki Aur Shunki
 D3 Dino Dharti Dhamaka
 Khazaano Ke Khilaadi
 Kung fu Pandav
 Kaptaan Kallu
 Nanhe Ninja
 Ninja Panja
 Om Jai Jagdish
 Pak Pak Pakaak
 Sabrina
 Tobot
 Transformers Prime
 Vikram Munja
 Vikram Betaal
  Kailash Ke Rakshak 
  Bali The Great 
  Lucky Aur Yaar 
 Bablu Dablu

Comedy series 
 Actor Calling Actor
 Bh Se Bhade
 Bhutu
 Boyz
 Chutki Baja Ke
 Comedy Ka Rocket
 Deewane Anjane
 Fakebook with Kavita
 Hazir Jawab Birbal
 Ji Sirji!
 Lete Hai Khabar Khabron Ki
 Love Dosti Aur Dua
 Mahisagar
 Mania Ki Duniya
 Nadaniyaan
 Narayan Narayan
 Nautanki News
 Naya Mahisagar
 Neeli Chatri Waale
 Pyar Marriage Shhhh (PMS)
 Tedi Medi Family
 Tera Baap Mera Baap
 Happu ki Ultan Paltan

Drama and live action series 
 Afsar Bitiya
 Akbar – Rakht Se Takht Ka Safar
 Aladdin – Jaanbaaz Ek Jalwe Anek
 Bal Gopal Kare Dhamaal
 Beta Hi Chahiye
 Chhoti Bahu 2
 Gangaa
 Hum Paanch Phir Se
 Chikh
 Khakhi Ek Vachan
 Kunwara Hai Par Hamara Hai
 Maa Shakti
 Pyar Ya Dehshat
 Rudra Ke Rakshak
 Shorveer Sisters
 Shaurya Veer Eklavya Ki Gatha
 Shaka Laka Boom Boom
 Sonpari
 Supergirl (TV series)
 Vijayi Bhav
 Yeh Kahan Aa Gaye Hum

Horror/supernatural series 
 Brahmarakshas
 Cheekh..Ek Khauffnakk Sach
 Fear Files
 Hatim (TV series)
 Maharakshak: Devi
 Maharakshak Aryan
 Naaginn – Waadon Ki Agniparikshaa

Mythological series 
 Baal Krishna
 Buddha
 Chakradhari Ajay Krishna
 Mahabharat
 Paramavatar Shri Krishna
 Ganesh Leela
 Jai Jai Jai Bajrang Bali
 Jai Maa Vindhyavasini
 Ramayan
 Shaktipeeth Ke Bhairav
Vikram Betaal Ki Rahasya Gatha

Reality/non-scripted programming 
 BIG Fame Star
 BIG Memsaab
 Bollywood Frydays
 Chef Vs Fridge
 Chutki Shopkeepaa Aur Woh
 Dance India Dance Li'l Masters
 Family Fortunes
 Khullja Sim Sim 
 India's Best Dramebaaz
 Sa Re Ga Ma Pa L'il Champs 2017

References 

Big Magic